Skowronków  is a village in the administrative district of Gmina Głuchołazy, within Nysa County, Opole Voivodeship, in south-western Poland, close to the Czech border.

Before 1958 it was a part of Czechoslovakia. The village became a part of Poland as a result of a minor land exchange with Czechoslovakia.

References

Villages in Nysa County